Clement Samuel Brimley (18 December 1863 – 23 July 1946) was a self-trained zoologist who worked at the North Carolina Museum of Natural Sciences. His brother, H.H. Brimley, was a zoologist and long-time director of the same museum. Both Brimley brothers are buried at Historic Oakwood Cemetery in Raleigh. Brimley's chorus frog was named for C.S. Brimley.

References and external links
Collecting Nature: The Beginning of the North Carolina Museum of Natural Sciences—accessed 19 June 2008
Herps of North Carolina--Brimley's Chorus Frog
University of Iowa, Museum of Natural History--A Whale for Iowa—accessed 19 June 2008
Journal of the North Carolina Academy of Sciences Collection—accessed 19 June 2008
Index to the Dictionary of North Carolina Biography—accessed 19 June 2008
Historic Oakwood Cemetery—grave listings, accessed 27 June 2008

Brimley, Brimley, Clement Samuel
Brimley, Brimley, Clement Samuel
Burials at Historic Oakwood Cemetery
Brimley family